This article details the Huddersfield Giants Rugby League Football Club's 2018 season.

Fixtures and results

Pre-season friendlies

Super League fixtures

Super League Super 8's

Challenge Cup

Transfers

In

Out

References

External links
giantsrl.com Huddersfield Giants Website

Huddersfield Giants seasons
Super League XXIII by club